The 2021 Bucknell Bison football team represented Bucknell University in the 2021 NCAA Division I FCS football season. The Bison, led by third-year head coach Dave Cecchini, played their home games at Christy Mathewson–Memorial Stadium as a member of the Patriot League.

Schedule

References

Bucknell
Bucknell Bison football seasons
Bucknell Bison football